Jake Stein (born 17 January 1994) is an Australian rules footballer with the Gold Coast Suns in the Australian Football League (AFL) and a former track and field athlete specialising in the decathlon.

In 2014 Stein won his first National open title and was chosen to represent Australia at the 2014 Commonwealth Games.

He also represented Australia at the 2011 World Youth Championships and the 2012 World Junior Championships. He finished first with a World Youth Best Performance in 2011 and finished second in 2012 behind Gunnar Nixon in a then Oceania Junior Record score of 7955 points.

Athletic career

Records and rankings
Stein has won one National Title at the Australian National Track & Field Championships in the Decathlon and has won a handful of medals at the Australian Junior Championships in the Junior Decathlon, Shot Put, Discus Throw & 110m Hurdles.

Competitions

World Youth Championships
Stein competed in the 7th edition of the World Youth Championships in 2011. He finished 1st with a new World Youth Best Performance, setting 6 personal bests on the way to gold.

World Junior Championships

In 2012 Stein competed in the World Junior Championships. There were two men other than Stein predicted to challenge for the title, Gunnar Nixon the eventual winner and Dutch National Junior Record holder Pieter Braun. In the end it came down to the 1500m where Stein went in with the lead but unfortunately Nixon finished too strongly and captured the title with Stein finishing in Second.

AFL career
In November 2016, Stein signed with the Greater Western Sydney Giants as a category B rookie.

Statistics

Personal bests

Achievements

References

External links

1994 births
Living people
Australian rules footballers from Sydney
Greater Western Sydney Giants players
Athletes (track and field) at the 2014 Commonwealth Games
Commonwealth Games competitors for Australia
Athletes from Sydney